Since the beginning one hundred years ago, forest management in Thailand has undergone many changes, in form of reclassifications, name changes and management changes. All this has resulted in a division of 16 regions with 5 branches in 2002. Five regions in Central-East with 28 national parks, four regions in the South with 39 national parks, four regions in the Northeast with 23 national parks and eight regions in the North with 65 national parks.

History
Royal Forest Department was reclassified from the Ministry of Interior to the Ministry of Kasettrathikarn in 1921. A 1932 revision by Royal Forest Department divided the forests in Thailand into 17 regions. An improvement in 1940 divided the forests in Thailand into 11 regions. A further improvement in 1952 was intended to establish 21 districts across the country, called "Forest Districts". 
A Royal Decree, no.119, issue 99kor, dated 2 October 2002 stated: Under the Ministry of Natural Resources and Environment, Royal Forest Department remains responsible for economic forestry work and a new Department of National Parks, Wildlife and Plant Conservation is further established, which is divided into 16 regions with 5 branches for the conservation, promotion and restoration of natural resources, wildlife and plant species in forest areas.

Central-East
As of 2022 the central and east of Thailand are divided into five regions with 28 national parks:
 PARO 1 {Prachinburi) with four national parks.
 PARO 1 (Saraburi branch) with two national parks.
 PARO 2 (Si Racha) with seven national parks.
 PARO 3 (Ban Pong) with nine national parks.
 PARO 3 (Phetcha Buri branch) with six national parks.

Protected Areas Regional Office 1 (Prachinburi)

Management overview PARO 1 (Prachinburi)

Visitors to 4 national parks (2019) of PARO 1 (Prachinburi)

The total number of visitors to 4 national parks in 2019 is 1,669,000.
Khao Yai has the largest number of visitors with 1,551,000 (93%).
The next two national parks, with resp 58,000 and 57,000 visitors, have a total of 115,000 visitors (7%).
Ta Phraya only has 3,000 visitors (0.2%).

Protected Areas Regional Office 1 (Saraburi branch)

Management overview PARO 1 (Saraburi branch)

Visitors to 2 national parks (2019) of PARO 1 (Saraburi branch)

The total number of visitors to 2 national parks in 2019 is 435,000.
Namtok Chat Sao Noi has the largest number of visitors with 389,000 (90%).
Namtok Sam Lan has 46,000 visitors (10%).

Protected Areas Regional Office 2 (Si Racha)

Management overview PARO 2 (Si Racha)

Visitors to 7 national parks (2019) of PARO 2 (Si Racha)

The total number of visitors to 7 national parks in 2019 is 3,975,000.
Khao Laem Ya–Mu Ko Samet has the largest number of visitors with 1,620,000 (41%).
Khao Khitchakut has 1,180,000 visitors (30%).
Namtok Phlio has 671,000 visitors (17%).
The next two national parks with 218,000 to 250,000 individually, have a total of 468,000 visitors (11%).  
The last two national parks with 10,000 to 26,000 individually, have a total of just 36,000 visitors (1%).

Protected Areas Regional Office 3 (Ban Pong)

Management overview PARO 3 (Ban Pong)

Visitors to 9 national parks (2019) of PARO 3 (Ban Pong)

The total number of visitors to 9 national parks in 2019 is 1,211,000.
Erawan national park has the largest number of visitors with 651,000 (54%).
The next three national parks with 112,000 to 145,000 individually, have a total of 374,000 visitors (31%).
The next two national parks with 66,000 and 75,000 individually, have a total of 141,000 visitors (11%).  
The last three national parks with 4,000 to 32,000 individually, have a total of just 45,000 visitors (4%).

Protected Areas Regional Office 3 (Phetchaburi branch)

Management overview PARO 3 (Phetchaburi branch)

Visitors to 6 national parks (2019) of PARO 3 (Phetchaburi branch)

The total number of visitors to 6 national parks in 2019 is 379,000.
Khao Sam Roi Yot national park has the largest number of visitors with 165,000 (44%).
Kaen Krachan national park has 104,000 visitors (27%).
The last four national parks with 19,000 to 43,000 visitors individually, have a total of 110,000 visitors (29%).

South
As of 2022 the south of Thailand is divided into four regions with 39 national parks:
 PARO 4 (Surat Thani) with eleven national parks.
 PARO 5 (Nakhon Si Thammarat) with twenty national parks.
 PARO 6 (Songkhla) with three national parks.
 PARO 6 (Pattani branch) with five national parks.

Protected Areas Regional Office 4 (Surat Thani)

Management overview PARO 4 (Surat Thani)

Visitors to 11 national parks (2019) of PARO 4 (Surat Thani)

The total number of visitors to 11 national parks in 2019 is 953,000.
Khao Sok national park has the largest number of visitors with 419,000 (44%).
The next three national parks with 126,000 to 158,000 individually, have a total of 418,000 visitors (44%).
The next four national parks with 14,000 and 53,000 individually, have a total of 113,000 visitors (12%).  
The last three national parks with 500 to 2,000 individually, have a total of just 3,000 visitors (0.3%).

Protected Areas Regional Office 5 (Nakhon Si Thammarat)

Management overview PARO 5 (Nakhon Si Thammarat)

Visitors to 20 national parks (2019) of PARO 5 (Nakhon Si Thammarat)

The total number of visitors to 20 national parks in 2019 is 4,177,000.
Hat Noppharat Thara–Mu Ko Phi Phi national park has the largest number of visitors with 1,142,000 (27%).
Ao Phang Nga national park has 999,000 visitors (24%).
Mu Ko Similan national park has 677,000 visitors (16%).
The next four national parks with 130,000 to 238,000 individually, have a total of 768,000 visitors (18%).  
The next seven national parks with 50,000 to 98,000 individually, have a total of 493,000 visitors (13%).
The last six national parks with 7,000 to 24,000 individually, have a total of 98,000 visitors (2%).

Protected Areas Regional Office 6 (Songkhla)

Management overview PARO 6 (Songkhla)

Visitors to 3 national parks (2019) of PARO 6 (Songkhla)

The total number of visitors to 3 national parks in 2019 is 177,000.
Khao Pu–Khao Ya national park has the largest number of visitors with 167,000 (94%).
San Kala Khiri national park has 8,000 visitors (5%).
Khao Nam Khang national park has 2,000 visitors (1%).

Protected Areas Regional Office 6 (Pattani branch)

Management overview PARO 6 (Pattani branch)

Visitors to 5 national parks (2019) of PARO 6 (Pattani branch)

The total number of visitors to 5 national parks in 2019 is 274,000.
Namtok Sai Khao national park has the largest number of visitors with 105,000 (38%).
Ao Manao-Khao Ranyong national park has 96,000 visitors (35%).
The next two national parks with 26,000 and 36,000 visitors individually, total 62,000 visitors (23%).
Bang Lang national park has 11,000 visitors (4%).

Northeast
As of 2022 the northeast of Thailand is divided into four regions with 23 national parks:
 PARO 7 (Nakhon Ratchasima) with four national parks.
 PARO 8 (Khon Kaen) with six national parks.
 PARO 9 (Ubon Ratchathani) with six national parks.
 PARO 10 (Udon Thani) with seven national parks.

Protected Areas Regional Office 7 (Nakhon Ratchasima)

Management overview PARO 7 (Nakhon Ratchasima)

Visitors to 4 national parks (2019) of PARO 7 (Nakhon Ratchasima)

The total number of visitors to 4 national parks in 2019 is 640,000.
Tat Ton has the largest number of visitors with 389,000 (61%).
The next two national parks, with 94,000 and 106,000 visitors, have a total of 200,000 visitors (31%).
Sai Thong has a total of 51,000 visitors (8%).

Protected Areas Regional Office 8 (Khon Kaen)

Management overview PARO 8 (Khon Kaen)

Visitors to 6 national parks (2019) of PARO 8 (Khon Kaen)

The total number of visitors to 6 national parks in 2019 is 350,000.
Phu Ruea has the largest number of visitors with 170,000 (49%).
The next two national parks, with 68,000 and 86,000 visitors, have a total of 154,000 visitors (44%).
The last three national parks, with 6,000 to 10,000 visitors, only have a total of 26,000 visitors (7%).

Protected Areas Regional Office 9 (Ubon Ratchathani)

Management overview PARO 9 (Ubon Ratchathani)

Visitors to 6 national parks (2019) of PARO 9 (Ubon Ratchathani)

The total number of visitors to 6 national parks in 2019 is 550,000.
Khao Phra Wihan national park has the largest number of visitors with 203,000 (37%).
Pha Taem national park has 180,000 visitors (33%).
The next two national parks, with 48,000 and 86,000 visitors, have a total of 134,000 visitors (25%).
The last two national parks, with 2,000 and 31,000 visitors, only have a total of 33,000 visitors (5%).

Protected Areas Regional Office 10 (Udon Thani)

Management overview PARO 10 (Udon Thani)

Visitors to 7 national parks (2019) of PARO 10 (Udon Thani)

The total number of visitors to 7 national parks in 2019 is 59,000.
Phu Langka national park has the largest number of visitors with 24,000 (41%).
The next two national parks, with 8,000 and 12,000 visitors, have a total of 20,000 visitors (34%).
The last four national parks, with 5,000 to 1,000 visitors, only have a total of 15,000 visitors (25%).

North
As of 2022 the north of Thailand is divided into eight regions with 65 national parks:
 PARO 11 (Phitsanulok) with ten national parks.
 PARO 12 (Nakhon Sawan) with three national parks.
 PARO 13 (Phrae) with ten national parks.
 PARO 13 (Lampang branch) with six national parks.
 PARO 14 (Tak) with eight national parks.
 PARO 15 (Chiang Rai) with eight national parks.
 PARO 16 (Chiang Mai) with fifteen national parks.
 PARO 16 (Mae Sariang branch) with five national parks.

Protected Areas Regional Office 11 (Phitsanulok)
The Protected Areas Regional Office 11 (Phitsanulok) is a Thai government unit under the Department of National Parks, Wildlife and Plant Conservation, one of the Protected Areas Regional Offices of Thailand. Since the beginning one hundred years ago, forest management of office 11 (Phitsanulok) has undergone many changes, in form of reclassifications, name changes and management changes.

History of PARO 11

1901-2002
In 1901, an agency called "Forest Region Phitsanulok" was established under the Royal Forest Department, Ministry of Interior, responsible for the following 7 provinces: Kamphaeng Phet, Phetchabun, Phichit, Phitsanulok, Sukhothai, Tak and Uttaradit. Royal Forest Department was reclassified from the Ministry of Interior to the Ministry of Kasettrathikarn in 1921.
"Office Forest Region Phitsanulok" was built near Chan Palace in 1924. A 1932 revision by Royal Forest Department divided the forests in Thailand into 17 regions, "Forest Region Phitsanulok" has 5 provinces to administer: Phetchabun, Phichit, Phitsanulok, Sukhothai and Uttaradit.
An improvement in 1940 divided the forests in Thailand into 11 regions, "Forest Region Phitsanulok" was responsible for 7 provinces: Kamphaeng Phet, Phetchabun, Phichit, Phitsanulok, Sukhothai, Tak and Uttaradit.
Further improvement in 1941 renamed "Forest Region Phitsanulok" to "Forest District Phitsanulok", responsible for 4 provinces: Phetchabun, Phichit, Phitsanulok and Uttaradit. A further improvement in 1952 was intended to establish 21 districts across the country, called "Forest Districts", "Forest District Phitsanulok" was still responsible for the 4 original provinces in 1952. In 1975, "Forest District Phitsanulok" was renamed "Forest District Office Phitsanulok".

2002-present
A Royal Decree, no.119, issue 99kor, dated 2 October 2002 stated: Under the Ministry of Natural Resources and Environment, Royal Forest Department remains responsible for economic forestry work and a new Department of National Parks, Wildlife and Plant Conservation is further established, which is divided into 16 regions with 5 branches for the conservation, promotion and restoration of natural resources, wildlife and plant species in forest areas. The name changed to "Protected Areas Regional Office 11 (Phitsanulok), PARO 11.
DNP regulation no.1241/2547 dated 27 July 2004, determined that management office 11 is responsible for 4 provinces: Nan, Phetchabun, Phitsanulok and Uttaradit. DNP regulation no.1808/2547 dated 15 November 2004, restricted the main areas to 3 provinces: Phetchabun, Phitsanulok and Uttaradit.
Its management is divided into 3 entities: National Parks and Forest Parks, Wildlife Sanctuaries and Non-hunting Areas, Botanical Garden and Arboreta.

Relocation
Since the Fine Arts Department has renovated the Chan Palace as a historical monument, PARO 11 (Phitsanulok) has to find a new place. On 23 June 2013, the foundation stone was laid for the new building in Tha Thong subdistrict, Mueang district, Phitsanulok province. Later on 25 January 2015 the Chan Palace area was abandoned and handed over to the Fine Arts Department. In Somdet Phra Naresuan the Great Army Camp, 4th Infantry Division, was the temporary office. The new, a typical Thai government building was inaugurated on 2 October 2017.

Management overview PARO 11 (Phitsanulok)

Visitors to 10 national parks (2019) of PARO 11

The total number of visitors to 10 national parks in 2019 is 496,000.
Phu Hin Rong Kla National Park has the largest number of visitors with 289,000 (58%).
The next four national parks, with 28,000 to 52,000 visitors individually, have a total of 146,000 visitors (30%).
The last five national parks, with 4,000 to 20,000 visitors individually, only have a total of 61,000 visitors (12%).

Protected Areas Regional Office 12 (Nakhon Sawan)

Management overview PARO 12 (Nakhon Sawan)

Visitors to 3 national parks (2019) of PARO 12

The total number of visitors to 3 national parks in 2019 is 291,000.
Khlong Lan National Park has the largest number of visitors with 206,000 (71%).
Mae Wong National Park has 52,000 visitors (18%).
Khlong Wang Chao National Park has 33,000 visitors (11%).

Protected Areas Regional Office 13 (Phrae)

Management overview PARO 13 (Phrae)

Visitors to 10 national parks (2019) of PARO 13

The total number of visitors to 10 national parks in 2019 is 273,000.
Si Nan National Park has the largest number of visitors with 115,000 (42%).
Doi Phu Kha National Park has 63,000 visitors (23%).
The next two national parks, with 22,000 and 32,000 visitors, have a total of 54,000 visitors (20%).
The last six national parks, with 3,000 to 12,000 visitors, have a total of 41,000 visitors (15%)

Protected Areas Regional Office 13 (Lampang branch)

Management overview PARO 13 (Lampang branch)

Visitors to 6 national parks (2019) of PARO 13 (Lampang branch)

The total number of visitors to 6 national parks in 2019 is 315,000.
Chae Son National Park has the largest number of visitors with 248,000 (80%).
The next two national parks, with 16,000 and 34,000 visitors, have a total of 50,000 visitors (15%).
The last three national parks, with 2,000 to 9,000 visitors, have a total of 17,000 visitors (5%)

Protected Areas Regional Office 14 (Tak)

Management overview PARO 14 (Tak)

Visitors to 8 national parks (2019) of PARO 14 (Tak)

The total number of visitors to 8 national parks in 2019 is 302,000.
Namtok Pha Charoen National Park has the largest number of visitors with 152,000 (50%).
The next four national parks, with 23,000 and 39,000 visitors, have a total of 120,000 visitors (40%).
The last three national parks, with 9,000 to 11,000 visitors, have a total of 30,000 visitors (10%)

Protected Areas Regional Office 15 (Chiang Rai)

Management overview PARO 15 (Chiang Rai)

Visitors to 8 national parks (2019) of PARO 15 (Chiang Rai)

The total number of visitors to 7 national parks in 2019 is 605,000.
Phu Chi Fa National Park has the largest number of visitors with 290,000 (48%).
The next two national parks, with 105,000 and 111,000 visitors, have a total of 216,000 visitors (35%).
The next two national parks, with 35,000 and 41,000 visitors, have a total of 76,000 visitors (13%).
The last two national parks, with 11,000 and 12,000 visitors, have a total of 23,000 visitors (4%).
 Due to the hype of the Tham Luang cave rescue operation, the number of visitors for Tham Luang–Khun Nam Nang Non National Park was 1,573,000.

Protected Areas Regional Office 16 (Chiang Mai)

Management overview PARO 16 (Chiang Mai)

Visitors to 15 national parks (2019) of PARO 16 (Chiang Mai)

The total number of visitors to 15 national parks in 2019 is 2,009,000.
Doi Inthanon National Park has the largest number of visitors with 874,000 (44%).
Doi Suthep–Pui National Park has 329,000 visitors (16%)
The next two national parks, with 164,000 and 168,000 visitors, have a total of 332,000 visitors (17%).
The next four national parks, with 62,000 to 91,000 visitors, have a total of 315,000 visitors (16%).
The last seven national parks, with 1,000 to 45,000 visitors, have a total of 159,000 visitors (7%).

Protected Areas Regional Office 16 (Mae Sariang branch)

Management overview PARO 16 (Mae Sariang branch)

Visitors to 5 national parks (2019) of PARO 16 (Mae Sariang branch)

The total number of visitors to 5 national parks in 2019 is 102,000.
Tham Pla–Namtok Pha Suea has the largest number of visitors with 89,000 (87%).
The next two national parks, with 5,000 and 6,000 visitors, have a total of 11,000 visitors (11%).
Salawin national park has a total of 2,000 visitors (2%).
Mae Sariang national park was still not selling tickets in 2019.

See also
 List of national parks of Thailand
 List of forest parks of Thailand

References

National parks of Thailand
Sub-departmental government bodies of Thailand
Ministry of Natural Resources and Environment (Thailand)